Frankie Edward Peter Merrifield (born 8 January 1994) is an English professional footballer who plays as a midfielder.

Career

AFC Wimbledon
Merrifield signed his first professional contract with AFC Wimbledon in December 2011, having joined the club's youth system at the age of 16 two years previously. Merrifield's contract with the club was extended on 18 May 2012. Merrifield made his league debut in a 5–1 defeat by Bradford City on 25 August 2012 as an 87th minute substitute for Christian Jolley. The midfielder scored his first senior goal for AFC Wimbledon in the first round of the 2012-13 Football League Trophy against Southend United on 4 September 2012, although the game ended in a 2–1 defeat after Ryan Cresswell scored for the Shrimpers in the fourth minute of stoppage time. Merrifield made his first league start for the Dons on 8 September 2012 in a 2–0 defeat against Northampton Town. On 30 November 2012, Merrifield was loaned out to Isthmian League Premier Division side Harrow Borough on an initial two-month loan deal along with teammate Emmanuel Akokhia. He made his debut for The Boro in a 0–0 draw with Whitehawk on 1 December 2012. On 8 December 2012, he struck a first-half equaliser for Harrow Borough against East Thurrock United, with the match eventually ending as a 3–2 defeat. On 29 January 2013, Merrifield scored his second league goal in a 3–2 loss to Metropolitan Police. On 4 February 2013, it was announced that Merrifield's loan spell had been extended by a further month. On 4 March 2013, it was announced that Merrifield had returned to AFC Wimbledon having made seven appearances in total for Harrow Borough. On 1 July 2013, it was announced that Merrifield had left the club.

Hayes & Yeading United
Merrifield featured in two of Hayes & Yeading United's pre-season matches after Phil Babb made his interest in the midfielder known. On 27 July 2013, he scored one goal in the 3–1 victory over Wealdstone, in the 63rd minute. On 15 August, he was announced as one of the club's new summer signings.

Bishop's Stortford
In October 2014, Merrifield signed for Bishop's Stortford. He scored on his debut against Eastbourne Borough.

Chelmsford City
On 31 May 2016, Merrifield joined manager Rod Stringer and teammate Anthony Church in the switch from Bishop's Stortford to Chelmsford City.

On 30 December 2016, Chelmsford City confirmed on their official Twitter profile, that Merrifeld Canvey Island had joined on a dual registration.

Notes
a.  Although Soccerway only credits Merrifield with one league goal for Hayes & Yeading United, the team's official website credits him with two. The discrepancy occurs in the 15 April game against Dorchester Town – Soccerway lists the first goalscorer as Freddie Ladapo, but the Hayes & Yeading United match report credits it to Merrifield. The video highlights of the game verify Merrifield as the goalscorer.

References

External links

1994 births
Living people
English footballers
Association football midfielders
AFC Wimbledon players
Harrow Borough F.C. players
Hayes & Yeading United F.C. players
Bishop's Stortford F.C. players
Chelmsford City F.C. players
Canvey Island F.C. players
East Thurrock United F.C. players
English Football League players
National League (English football) players
Isthmian League players
Footballers from the London Borough of Hackney